Diceras is an extinct genus of fossil saltwater clams, marine heterodont bivalve molluscs. These bivalves were stationary epifaunal suspension feeders.

Species
Species within the genus Diceras:
†Diceras brevicornum Karczewski 1969
†Diceras impressum Karczewski 1969
†Diceras originale Bayle 1873

Distribution
Fossils of species belonging to this genus have been found in the Cretaceous of France and in the Jurassic of Croatia, Czech Republic, France, Germany, Morocco, Poland, Romania and Slovenia.

References 

 Paleobiology Database
 Biolib

Prehistoric bivalve genera
Hippuritida